Arjon Mustafa (born 29 January 1980) is an Albanian retired footballer who played as a goalkeeper.

Honours

Vllaznia 
 Albanian Superliga (2): 1997–98, 2000–2001
 Albanian Supercup (2): 1998, 2001

References

External links
 Profile - FSHF

1980 births
Living people
Footballers from Shkodër
Albanian footballers
Association football goalkeepers
KF Vllaznia Shkodër players
KS Lushnja players
KF Elbasani players
KF Skënderbeu Korçë players
Besa Kavajë players
KS Kastrioti players
FK Partizani Tirana players
FC Kamza players
Kategoria e Parë players
Kategoria Superiore players